The 2003 World Table Tennis Championships women's doubles was the 46th edition of the women's doubles championship.
Zhang Yining and Wang Nan defeated Niu Jianfeng and Guo Yue in the final by four sets to one.

Finals

References

External links
 Main draw archived from ITTF.
 Players' matches. ITTF.
 WM 2003 Paris (Frankreich). tt-wiki.info (in German).

-
World